Ferlon Charles Christians is a South African politician. A member of the African Christian Democratic Party, he is the provincial leader of the party in the Western Cape and a Member of the Western Cape Provincial Parliament. He took office as an MPP in 2014. Christians previously served as SCOPA chairperson in the provincial parliament.

References

External links
People's Assembly – Mr Ferlon Charles Christians
WCPP – Hon Ferlon Christians

Living people
Year of birth missing (living people)
African Christian Democratic Party politicians
Members of the Western Cape Provincial Parliament
Politicians from Cape Town
Coloured South African people
South African Christians